Serie A2 is the top-level minor baseball league in Italy. It is part of a promotion and relegation system with Serie A1, meaning some teams have played at both levels at some point.

Baseball competitions in Italy
Baseball leagues in Europe
Sports leagues in Italy